Cecil Stallard Trouncer (5 April 1898 – 15 December 1953) was an English actor. His daughter Ruth Trouncer also took up acting.

Early life
Cecil Trouncer was born in Southport on 5 April 1898 and was educated at Clifton College. During the First World War he served in the 3rd Battalion, of the Dorset Regiment.

Filmography
 Pygmalion (1938)
 While the Sun Shines (1947)
 London Belongs to Me (1948)
 Saraband for Dead Lovers (1948)
 The Guinea Pig (1948)
 The Lady with a Lamp (1951)
 The Magic Box (1951)
 The Pickwick Papers (1952)
 Isn't Life Wonderful! (1953)
 The Weak and the Wicked (1954)

References

External links
 

1898 births
1953 deaths
English male stage actors
English male film actors
People from Southport
People educated at Clifton College
20th-century English male actors